Smoke on the Water: The Best Of is a compilation album by the British hard rock band Deep Purple in 1994. It was released only in France where it sold very well, attaining double gold disc status in December 1998.

Track listing
All titles composed by Ritchie Blackmore, Ian Gillan, Roger Glover, Jon Lord, Ian Paice, except where indicated

"Hush" (Joe South) – 4:20
"Kentucky Woman" (Single edit) (Neil Diamond) – 4:05
"The Bird Has Flown" (Single edit) (Blackmore, Lord, Rod Evans) – 2:52
"Hallelujah" (Roger Greenaway, Roger Cook) – 3:41
"Black Night" – 3:24
"Child in Time" – 10:16
"Speed King" (Dutch single edit) – 4:22
"Strange Kind of Woman" (Single edit) – 3:45
"Fireball" (Single edit) – 3:19
"Smoke on the Water" (US single edit) – 3:44
"Highway Star" – 6:05
"Never Before" (Single edit) – 3:27
"Space Truckin'" – 4:31
"Woman from Tokyo" (Single edit) – 2:43
"Might Just Take Your Life" (Single edit) (Blackmore, Lord, Paice, David Coverdale) – 3:32
"Burn" (Single edit) (Blackmore, David Coverdale, Glenn Hughes, Lord, Paice) – 4:08
"Stormbringer" (Blackmore, Coverdale) – 4:28
"You Keep on Moving" (Single edit) (Coverdale, Hughes) – 4:26

Charts

Certifications

References

1994 compilation albums
Deep Purple compilation albums
EMI Records compilation albums